Fusiturricula andrei is a species of sea snail, a marine gastropod mollusk in the family Drilliidae.

Description
The size of an adult shell varies between 35 mm and 50 mm.

Distribution
This species occurs in the demersal zone of the Pacific Ocean off Isla Santa Cruz, Galápagos Islands

References

  Tucker, J.K. 2004 Catalog of recent and fossil turrids (Mollusca: Gastropoda). Zootaxa 682:1–1295
 McLean & Poorman, 1971. New species of Tropical Eastern Pacific Turridae; The Veliger, 14, 89–113

External links
 

andrei
Gastropods described in 1971